In social choice and operations research, the egalitarian rule (also called the max-min rule or the Rawlsian rule) is a rule saying that, among all possible alternatives, society should pick the alternative which maximizes the minimum utility of all individuals in society. It is a formal mathematical representation of the egalitarian philosophy. It also corresponds to John Rawls' principle of maximizing the welfare of the worst-off individual.

Definition 
Let  be a set of possible `states of the world' or `alternatives'. For example, in a single-winner election,  may represent the set of candidates; in a resource allocation setting,  may represent all possible allocations.

Let  be a finite set, representing a collection of individuals.  For each , let  be a utility function, describing the amount of happiness an individual i derives from each possible state.

The question of what 'best' means is the basic question of social choice theory. The egalitarian rule selects an element  which maximizes the minimum utility, that is, it solves the following optimization problem:

Leximin rule 
Often, there are many different states with the same minimum utility. For example, a state with utility profile (0,100,100) has the same minimum value as a state with utility profile (0,0,0). In this case, the egalitarian rule often uses the leximin order, that is: subject to maximizing the smallest utilty, it aims to maximize the next-smallest utility; subject to that, maximize the next-smallest utility, and so on.  

For example, suppose there are two individuals - Alice and George, and three possible states: state x gives a utility of 2 to Alice and 4 to George; state y gives a utility of 9 to Alice and 1 to George; and state z gives a utility of 1 to Alice and 8 to George. Then state x is leximin-optimal, since its utility profile is (2,4) which is leximin-larger than that of y (9,1) and z (1,8).

The egalitarian rule strengthened with the leximin order is often called the leximin rule, to distinguish it from the simpler max-min rule.

The leximin rule for social choice was introduced by Amartya Sen in 1970, and discussed in depth in many later books.

Properties

Pareto efficiency 
The max-min rule may not necessarily lead to a Pareto efficient outcome. For example, it may choose a state which leades to a utility profile (3,3,3), while there is another state leading to a utility profile (3,4,5), which is a Pareto-improvement.

In contrast, the leximin rule always selects a Pareto-efficient outcome. This is because any Pareto-improvement leads to a leximin-better utility vector: if a state y Pareto-dominates a state x, then y is also leximin-better than x.

Pigou-Dalton property 
The leximin rule satisfies the Pigou–Dalton principle, that is: if utility is "moved" from an agent with less utility to an agent with more utility, and as a result, the utility-difference between them becomes smaller, then resulting alternative is preferred.

Moreover, the leximin rule is the only social-welfare ordering rule which simultaneously satisfies the following three properties:

 Pareto efficiency;
 Pigou-Dalton principle;
 Independence of common utility pace - if all utilities are transformed by a common monotonically-increasing function, then the ordering of the alternatives remains the same.

Egalitarian resource allocation 
The egalitarian rule is particularly useful as a rule for fair division. In this setting, the set  represents all possible allocations, and the goal is to find an allocation which maximizes the minimum utility, or the leximin vector. This rule has been studied in several contexts: 

 Division of a single homogeneous resource; 
 Fair subset sum problem; 
 Egalitarian cake-cutting; 
 Egalitarian item allocation. 
Egalitarian (leximin) bargaining.

See also 

 Utilitarian rule - a different rule, that emphasizes the sum of utilities rather than the smallest utility.
Proportional-fair rule - a rule that tries to balance the efficiency of the utilitarian rule and the fairness of the egalitarian rule.
Max-min fair scheduling - max-min fairness in process scheduling.

References 

Egalitarianism
Fairness criteria